Janice Faye Lawrence Braxton (born June 7, 1962) is an American  professional women's basketball player. She was born in Lucedale, Mississippi. Braxton was inducted into the Women's Basketball Hall of Fame in 2006.

College
Braxton played college basketball for Louisiana Tech, where she helped lead the Lady Techsters to national championships in 1981 and 1982. While only a sophomore in 1982, she was the leading scorer in the NCAA tournament, and was named the tournament MVP. Braxton won the WBCA Player of the Year award in 1984.

Louisiana Tech statistics
Source

USA Basketball
Braxton was a member of the 1983 Pan American team that won a gold medal in Venezuela.

Braxton was a member of the USA National team at the 1983 World Championships, held in Sao Paulo, Brazil. The team won six games, but lost two against the Soviet Union. In an opening round game, the USA team had a nine-point lead at halftime, but the Soviets came back to take the lead, and a final shot by the USA failed to drop, leaving the USSR team with a one-point victory 85–84. The USA team won their next four games, setting up the gold medal game against USSR. This game was also close, and was tied at 82 points each with six seconds to go in the game. Elena Chausova of the Soviet Union received the inbounds pass and hit the game winning shot in the final seconds, giving the USSR team the gold medal with a score of 84–82. The USA team earned the silver medal. Braxton averaged 8.9 points per game.

In 1984, the USA sent its National team to the 1984 William Jones Cup competition in Taipei, Taiwan, for pre-Olympic practice. The team easily beat each of the eight teams they played, winning by an average of just under 50 points per game. Braxton averaged 6.7 points per game.

She won a gold medal with the USA Women's Olympic basketball team in 1984.

She was inducted into the Louisiana Tech University Athletic Hall of Fame in 1987. In 2006, Braxton was elected to the Women's Basketball Hall of Fame, located in Knoxville, Tennessee.

Professional career
Braxton played for the New York team in the Women's American Basketball Association, a short-lived league in the mid-80's (not to be confused with WABA a league of the same name existing in 2002).

Braxton played 13 seasons in Europe with Vicenza, Messina and Parma in Italian League. The Vicenza team won four European Champions Cup while Braxton played for the team, scoring almost 23 points per game. She earned All-Star honors in 1997.

She spent three seasons playing for the Cleveland Rockers in the Women's National Basketball Association (WNBA).

1997–1999: Cleveland Rockers

In 2003, she joined the Cleveland Rockers as an assistant coach.

Awards and honors
 1982—NCAA Tournament MVP
 1983—Kodak All-America
 1984—Kodak All-America
 1984—Wade Trophy

Career statistics

Regular season

|-
| style="text-align:left;"|1997
| style="text-align:left;"|Cleveland
| 25 || 24 || 32.9 || .417 || .500 || .768 || 7.6 || 2.0 || 1.4 || 1.1 || 2.1 || 11.5
|-
| style="text-align:left;"|1998
| style="text-align:left;"|Cleveland
| 30 || 30 || 28.0 || .495 || .333 || .755 || 5.6 || 2.5 || 1.7 || 0.5 || 2.2 || 9.8
|-
| style="text-align:left;"|1999
| style="text-align:left;"|Cleveland
| 26 || 21 || 18.3 || .460 || .125 || .697 || 4.3 || 1.3 || 0.7 || 0.5 || 1.3 || 5.8
|-
| style="text-align:left;"|Career
| style="text-align:left;"|3 years, 1 team
| 81 || 75 || 26.4 || .458 || .333 || .748 || 5.8 || 1.9 || 1.3 || 0.7 || 1.9 || 9.0

Playoffs

|-
| style="text-align:left;"|1998
| style="text-align:left;"|Cleveland
| 3 || 3 || 27.7 || .385 || .000 || .857 || 6.3 || 2.0 || 0.7 || 0.0 || 2.3 || 10.7

Notes

References
 

1962 births
Living people
African-American basketball players
All-American college women's basketball players
American women's basketball players
Basketball players at the 1983 Pan American Games
Basketball players at the 1984 Summer Olympics
Basketball players from Mississippi
Cleveland Rockers players
Forwards (basketball)
Louisiana Tech Lady Techsters basketball players
Medalists at the 1984 Summer Olympics
Olympic gold medalists for the United States in basketball
Pan American Games gold medalists for the United States
Pan American Games medalists in basketball
Parade High School All-Americans (girls' basketball)
People from Lucedale, Mississippi
Medalists at the 1983 Pan American Games
21st-century African-American people
21st-century African-American women
20th-century African-American sportspeople
20th-century African-American women
20th-century African-American people
United States women's national basketball team players